This is a list of events in Scottish television from 1988.

Events

January
19 January – Debut of the BBC Scotland television film Down Where the Buffalo Go.

February
13 February – Scottish Television (STV) begins 24-hour broadcasting.

March to June
No events.

July
19 July – Debut on ITV of the STV produced game show Wheel of Fortune.

August
No events.

September
2 September – Grampian and Border begin 24-hour transmission. Their overnight programming comes from Granada Television's Night Time service.

October
No events.

November
No events.

December
31 December – Transmission of Tony Roper's The Steamie, about life in a Glasgow wash-house during the 1950s, starring Dorothy Paul and Eileen McCallum.

Debuts

ITV
19 July – Wheel of Fortune (1988–2001)

Television series
Scotsport (1957–2008)
Reporting Scotland (1968–1983; 1984–present)
Top Club (1971–1998)
Scotland Today (1972–2009)
Sportscene (1975–present)
The Beechgrove Garden (1978–present)
Grampian Today (1980–2009)
Take the High Road (1980–2003)
Taggart (1983–2010)
James the Cat (1984–1992)
Crossfire on Grampian (1984–2004)
City Lights (1984–1991)
The Campbells (1986–1990)
Naked Video (1986–1991)

Births
27 January – Iain Stirling, comedian

See also
1988 in Scotland

References

 
Television in Scotland by year
1980s in Scottish television